Milesburg is a borough in Centre County, Pennsylvania. It is part of the State College, Pennsylvania metropolitan statistical area. The population was 1,123 at the 2010 census.

History
Milesburg and nearby Miles Township were named after Samuel Miles, who co-owned the Centre Furnace Iron Works, along with Colonel John Patton and John Dunlop.

Milesburg is located near the site of a former Lenape Indian settlement known as Bald Eagle's Nest.

Iddings-Baldridge House in Milesburg was added to the National Register of Historic Places in 1977.

Geography
Milesburg is located at  (40.942533, -77.789207).

Demographics

At the 2010 census there were 1,123 people, 459 households, and 305 families residing in the borough. The population density was 2,503.4 people per square mile (966.8/km²). There were 489 housing units at an average density of 1,090.1 per square mile (421.0/km²). The racial makeup of the borough was 98.7% White, 0.4% Black or African American, 0.1% Native American, 0.4% Asian, 0.2% other, and 0.2% from other races. Hispanic or Latino of any race were 0.3%.

There were 459 households, 29.8% had children under the age of 18 living with them, 47.3% were married couples living together, 6.2% had a male householder with no wife present, 12.9% had a female householder with no husband present, and 33.6% were non-families. 26.6% of households were made up of individuals, and 8.5% were one person aged 65 or older. The average household size was 2.45 and the average family size was 2.77.

In the borough, the population was spread out, with 19.1% under the age of 18, 8.8% from 18 to 24, 25.3% from 25 to 44, 29.3% from 45 to 64, and 17.5% 65 or older. The median age was 42 years. For every 100 females there were 89.1 males. For every 100 females age 18 and over, there were 87.8 males.

The median household income was $45,588 and the median family income  was $51,597.  The per capita income for the borough was $19,310. About 5.0% of families and 7.2% of the population were below the poverty line, including 1.7% of those under age 18 and 3.4% of those age 65 or over.

References

External links
Official website

1843 establishments in Pennsylvania
Boroughs in Centre County, Pennsylvania
Populated places established in 1793